East Coast Light I is an abstract painting by Irish-born American artist Sean Scully, from 1973.

Description
The painting is an oil on canvas with dimensions  of 216 x 254 centimeters. It is in the collection of the Crawford Gallery, in Cork.

Analysis
It is an early work, exhibited in 1973 in Cork. It is a hard-edged abstraction style painting.

References

1973 paintings
Paintings by Sean Scully